Anthia omoplata is a species of ground beetle in the subfamily Anthiinae. It was described by Lequien in 1832.

References

Anthiinae (beetle)
Beetles described in 1832